ISA Lille, formerly the Institut Supérieur d'Agriculture de Lille, is one of 205 French schools accredited on September 1, 2018 to deliver a Diplôme d'Ingénieur engineering degree. It is a "grande école", in the French system of Higher Education.

It consists of a institution focused on agricultural engineering, mandated by the French Ministry of Agriculture.  It was created in 1963 at the request of agricultural professional organisations, the school's mission is two-fold: education and research. ISA Lille is one of the 4 schools which make up France Agro 3, the French network for Education and Research in Life Sciences.

ISA Lille is a member of the Polytechnical University Federation of Lille, a local group of Catholic schools. In 2016, the group of Engineering schools of Lille Catholic University—HEI (Hautes études d'ingénieur), ISA and ISEN (Institut supérieur de l'électronique et du numérique), merged under the name Yncréa Hauts-de-France. Each school maintains its own degree, areas of expertise, and distinctive pedagogical approach.

In July 2019, ISA Lille was recognized as the Sustainability Institution of the Year by Campus Responsables and earned 2nd place in the International Green Gown awards.

Academic programs 
The school offers a range of degree programs, as well as research and business services, specialising in sectors of Agricultural science, Food science, Environmental science, and Agricultural economics. The school was among the first French higher education institutions to offer programmes 100% taught in English.

Undergraduate courses 
ISA Lille does not deliver Bachelor degrees, however high school graduates may join the integrated preparatory course prior to studying in the engineering program.

Master of Science in Engineering 
Students with a Bachelor of Science in a related scientific discipline may join ISA Lille in the 4th year, the first year of the Master programme.  The degree is accredited by the Commission des titres d'ingénieur and internationally recognised as a Master of Science in Engineering.

Research 

ISA Lille participates in various domains of research activities: Sensory analysis, New Product Development, Depollution of Soils, Bioindicators of Pollution, Animal welfare, Agricultural Forecasting, the Study of Parasites and Fungi, and Agricultural Statistics

References

External links 
 Official site in English

Agricultural schools
Grandes écoles
Educational buildings in Lille
Catholic universities and colleges in France
Private universities and colleges in France